Negrești is a town in Vaslui County, located in the eastern part of Western Moldavia, a traditional region of Romania. It has a population of around 8,000. Its name comes from distinguished nobleman Negrea, who had worked in the council of Alexander the Good.

The town administers six villages: Căzănești, Cioatele, Glodeni, Parpanița, Poiana and Valea Mare.

References

Towns in Romania
Populated places in Vaslui County
Localities in Western Moldavia